William Easterly Ashton (June 5, 1859 – March 30, 1933) was a noted gynecologist and surgeon.  He also served in the United States Army as a regimental surgeon during World War I.

Early life and education
Ashton was born in Philadelphia, Pennsylvania, on June 5, 1859, to Samuel Keen and Caroline M. Ashton.  His brother is Thomas G. Ashton.

He attended the University of Pennsylvania and graduated as a Doctor of Medicine in 1881.  He later attended Jefferson Medical College and Ursinus.

Early medical career 
Ashton served on the faculty of the hospital and Jefferson Medical College from 1884 until 1892.

From 1892 to 1916, he was a gynecologist and professor of gynecology at Medico-Chirug. College.  In 1916, he was a professor of gynecology at the University of Pennsylvania.

He invented surgical instruments and appliances.

Military career 
Ashton enlisted in the United States Army in 1917 as a major.  He was assigned as the regimental surgeon to the 309th Field Artillery, 78th Division.  He served in France for 11 months and participated in the St. Mihiel and Meuse-Argonne offensives.  He was promoted to lieutenant colonel in February 1919.  Ashton was gassed during the Argonne offensive.  He retired from service in April 1919.

Publications 
Ashton, William Easterly. Questions and Answers on the Essentials of Obstetrics; Prepared Especially for Students of Medicine. Philadelphia: Saunders, 1888.
Ashton, William Easterly. A Text-Book on the Practice of Gynecology for Practitioners and Students. Philadelphia: Saunders, 1905.

Personal life
Ashton married Alice Elizabeth Rosengarten on October 5, 1891.  They had one daughter named Dorothy.

Awards and honors 
Ashton received the Distinguished Service Cross for "extraordinary heroism in action while serving with Medical Detachment, 309th Field Artillery." During the course of treating his patients, he "was subjected to constant explosion of phosgene shells and, in order to perform his duties, he was forced to remove his gas mask."

Death and legacy
Ashton died on March 30, 1933.

References 

1859 births
1933 deaths
United States Army officers
American gynecologists
Recipients of the Distinguished Service Cross (United States)
Perelman School of Medicine at the University of Pennsylvania alumni
University of Pennsylvania faculty
American military doctors